Bag-a-Trix is the fifth studio album by the American hip hop group Whodini, their only album for MCA Records. It was released in 1991 and includes the singles "Freaks" and "Judy". The production was handled by Larry Smith, Fresh Gordon, Joe Simmons, and Major Jam Production.

Chart performance
Bag-a-Trix peaked at number 48 on the Billboard Top R&B Albums chart in May 1991. The singles, "Freaks" and "Judy", peaked at Nos. 73 and 65, respectively, on the Hot R&B Singles chart.

Track listing

Personnel
Jalil Hutchins - performer
John "Ecstacy" Fletcher - performer
Dynasty And Mimi - performer (track 9)
Lawrence Michael Smith - producer (tracks: 1, 3-4, 8, 11, 14)
Gordon Wayne Pickett - producer (tracks: 2, 5-7)
Joe Simmons - producer (track 1)
Major Jam Productions - producer (tracks: 3, 8-10, 12-13)
Charlie Harrison - guitar (track 3)
Akili Walker - mixing & recording (tracks: 1-12, 14)
Peter Robbins - mixing, recording (track 13)
Dino Esposito - mixing (tracks: 1-12, 14)
George Mayers - mixing (tracks: 1-12, 14)
Howie Weinberg - mastering

References

External links 

1991 albums
Whodini albums
MCA Records albums
Albums produced by Larry Smith (producer)